Raphitoma alleryana is a species of sea snail, a marine gastropod mollusc in the family Raphitomidae.

Description
The length of the shell reaches a length of 10 mm.

A shell with a minute, elegant fusiform shape, very distinct from its congeners through its sleek appearance produced by the rapidly growing in volume of its 6½ slightly convex whorls, for the subtle reticulation and the low elevation of the ribs which gives it a pearly appearance, and finally for the softness of the shell and its golden-yellow to horny color.. The suture is impressed. The aperture is subovate with a simple outer lip with inconspicuous denticles. The short siphonal canal is slightly inflected. The body whorl shows a conspicuous white submedian band. The smooth apex has a bright, horny color. The columella is almost straight.

Distribution
This marine species occurs in the Western Mediterranean Sea and off Italy and Portugal.

References

 Sulliotti, G.R. (1889b) Comunicazioni malacologiche articolo secondo. Bullettino della Società Malacologica Italiana, 14, 65–74
 Giannuzzi-Savelli R., Pusateri F. & Bartolini S. (2018). A revision of the Mediterranean Raphitomidae (Gastropoda: Conoidea) 5: loss of planktotrophy and pairs of species, with the description of four new species. Bollettino Malacologico. 54, supplement 11: 1-77

External links
 
 Biolib.cz: Raphitoma alleryana 

alleryana
Gastropods described in 1889